FC Twenty 11 is a New Zealand amateur football club based in the city of Christchurch. The club was formed in 2011 following the merger of Avon United and Burnside A.F.C.

The club is based in the western part of Christchurch and draw most of their players from Avonhead, Riccarton, Burnside, Fendalton, Ilam, Bryndwr and Hornby. The club rooms are situated at Riccarton Domain on Yaldhurst Road.

References

External links
Official website
NZ Clubs Database
Mainland Football
NZ Football

Association football clubs established in 2011
Association football clubs in Christchurch
2011 establishments in New Zealand